John Henry Knott (March 2, 1907 – October 13, 1981) was an American Major League Baseball pitcher with the St. Louis Browns (1933-1938), Chicago White Sox (1938-1940) and Philadelphia Athletics (1941-1942, 1946). Knott batted and threw right-handed. He was born in Dallas, Texas.

He led the American League in saves (7) in 1935 and earned runs allowed (156) in 1936, and home runs allowed (25) in 1937.  In 11 seasons he had an 82–103 win–loss record in 325 games, with 192 games started, 62 complete games, 4 shutouts, 19 saves, 484 strikeouts, and a 4.97 ERA.

Knott served in the military during World War II, and he was wounded on January 10, 1945, during the Battle of the Bulge. 
  
He was an alumnus of Southern Methodist University and died in Brownwood, Texas, at the age of 74.

See also
 List of Major League Baseball annual saves leaders

References

External links

Interview with Jack Knott by Eugene Murdock, June 5, 1978, in Brownwood, Texas (1 hour 30 minutes)

1907 births
1981 deaths
United States Army personnel of World War II
Baseball players from Dallas
Chattanooga Lookouts players
Chicago White Sox players
Cincinnati Reds scouts
Corsicana Oilers players
Dallas Steers players
Jersey City Giants players
Major League Baseball pitchers
Milwaukee Brewers (minor league) players
Mission Reds players
Palestine Pals players
Philadelphia Athletics players
St. Louis Browns players
SMU Mustangs baseball players
Southern Methodist University alumni